James Otis Graham, better known as Scottie, (born March 28, 1969) is a former professional football player who played running back for six seasons in the National Football League (NFL) with the New York Jets (1992), the Minnesota Vikings (1993–1996), and the Cincinnati Bengals (1997).

Career
Graham attended Long Beach High School in Long Beach, New York, where he was a high school All-American in three sports: football, wrestling and lacrosse.  He continued his football career with a full scholarship to The Ohio State University, lettering four years and starting three years as running back. Senior year, Scottie was elected team captain by his peers.

Graham continued his graduate studies during the off-season and received his master's degree in Black Studies at Ohio State during his fourth year with the Minnesota Vikings. In 1993, Graham certainly climbed through the ranks to make a name for himself, finishing the season as Minnesota's leading rusher, and by the end of December, his 448 yards placed him 16th in the NFC with zero fumbles. In one two game stretch, Scottie rushed for 139 yards against the Green Bay Packers and the following week, rushed for 166 yards against the Kansas City Chiefs.  These 305 total rushing yards during two games were the most ever by a Viking running back in a two-game stretch.

Currently entering his 13th year with the NFL Players Association in Washington, D.C., Graham began his career as a Regional Director with the trade association; however, he moved to the commercial subsidiary NFL PLAYERS to directly engage players with business partners, as the Director of Player  Marketing and Engagement.

References

1969 births
Living people
American football running backs
Cincinnati Bengals players
Long Beach High School (New York) alumni
Minnesota Vikings players
New York Jets players
Ohio State Buckeyes football players
People from Long Beach, New York
Players of American football from New York (state)
Sportspeople from Nassau County, New York
Ed Block Courage Award recipients